Live at the Whisky is the second live recording by American rock band Kansas, released in 1992. The U.S. version includes a bonus track "Lonely Street" from 1975. A German version of the release contains an alternative bonus track, "Journey from Mariabronn" which actually includes both "Belexes" and "Journey from Mariabronn" together from that same show. The German bonus track is also available on iTunes, Napster, and other streaming services.

The album notes state that it was recorded in "one take", and has been criticized by some because of the harsh vocals of singer Steve Walsh, whose voice was failing at that time as a result of a variety of issues, including fatigue and substance abuse. It was the first official Kansas release (other than compilations) not to reach the album charts, and also the first not released on a major record label.

Walsh has stated in interviews that the recording of this CD and video was doomed from the beginning and he is embarrassed of anything that has to do with it. Since the band was funding this CD and video themselves, to save money, the band used videotape instead of film, which caused problems during the filming. Excessive lighting had to be used on stage so the videotape would pick up all the images which then led to excessive heat on stage making the performers sweat which was rather unflattering when watching the finished product. A filter was used during editing that softened the images but it caused the picture to look distorted making purchasers wonder if they had received a defective item.

While the recording of the band was recorded in one take, the vocal track was not and was overdubbed at a later date. Walsh has said this was a very difficult time for him when it came to his substance abuse. He was smoking pot and using cocaine on a daily basis as well as drinking excessively, which caused him to be exhausted and run down so on top of all of those things he also happened to be sick that night. Walsh has also stated that the band has no plans on re-releasing the video in its entirety, they consider it an embarrassment and consider fans lucky if they have a copy. There is a "Director's cut" with extra performances of the video that has surfaced in recent years with the original vocal track intact and without the use of the softening filter.

CD and VHS track listings

Personnel
Kansas
Steve Walsh - vocals, keyboards
Rich Williams - guitar
David Ragsdale - violin, guitar
Greg Robert - keyboards
Billy Greer - bass guitar
Phil Ehart - drums, producer

Guest musicians
Kerry Livgren - guitar on "Dust in the Wind", "Carry On Wayward Son" and "Lonely Street"
Dave Hope - bass guitar on "Lonely Street"

Production
Jeff Glixman - producer, mixing at Triclops Sound Studio, Atlanta, Georgia
Guy Charbonneau - live recording engineer
Mark Richardson - mixing assistant
Kevin Reeves - digital editing
Wally Traugott - digital mastering at Capitol Studios, Los Angeles, California
Steven Parke - cover illustration
Laurie Anderson - graphic design
Scott Larsen - art direction
Ginny Nichols - photography

References

Kansas (band) live albums
1992 live albums
Albums recorded at the Whisky a Go Go
Albums produced by Jeff Glixman
1992 video albums
Live video albums